St Michael and All Angels’ Church is a Grade II* listed  parish church in the Church of England in East Coker, Somerset.

History

The church dates from the late 12th century, but much of the surviving fabric is 15th century. In the 14th century the rector was appointed by the Lord of the Manor at the adjoining Coker Court. The window of the asouth transept includes the coat of arms of the Helyar family who were the local lords, including William Helyar who became archdeacon of Barnstaple and built the Helyar Almshouses.

The central tower was replaced in 1791 by a north east tower designed by Joseph Radford.

The brass eagle lectern was dedicated on Christmas Eve in 1898 in commemoration of the Diamond Jubilee of Queen Victoria's reign.

The church is noted as the resting place of the poet T. S. Eliot whose ashes were interred in 1965.

Incumbents

Rectors up to Peter Falewell, after that, vicars

Organ

The pipe organ is by E. Lifford and Co of Yeovil. A specification of the organ can be found on the National Pipe Organ Register.

Bells

The tower contains a ring of 8 bells, all dating from 1770 or 1771 and cast by Thomas II Bilbie of the Bilbie family.

Parish status

The church is in a joint parish with
St Mary's Church, East Chinnock
St Mary's Church, Hardington Mandeville
St Roch's Church, Pendomer
All Saints’ Church, Closworth
St Martin of Tours' Church, West Coker
All Saints' Church, Sutton Bingham

See also  
 List of ecclesiastical parishes in the Diocese of Bath and Wells

References

East Coker
East Coker
12th-century church buildings in England